Michaela Pazderová (born 21 January 1963) is a Czech former professional tennis player.

Pazderová made the third round of the singles at the 1982 French Open. Entering the main draw as a qualifier, she had wins over Sophie Amiach and Renáta Tomanová, before her run was ended by eighth seed Anne Smith.

References

External links
 
 

1963 births
Living people
Czechoslovak female tennis players